The Golf Digest Tournament was a golf tournament in Japan. It was founded in 1971 and was part of the Japan Golf Tour from 1973 to 1997. It was played in October at the Tōmei Country Club near Susono, Shizuoka.

Winners

Notes

References

External links
Coverage on Japan Golf Tour's official site

Former Japan Golf Tour events
Defunct golf tournaments in Japan
Sport in Shizuoka Prefecture
Recurring sporting events established in 1971
Recurring sporting events disestablished in 1997
1971 establishments in Japan
1997 disestablishments in Japan